Precis antilope, the darker commodore, is a species of butterfly in the family Nymphalidae, found in the dry season and is native to Subsaharan Africa. 

The wingspan is 40–55 mm in males and 50–60 mm in females.

The flight period is from December to March.

The larvae feed on Coleus and Plastostema species.

References

Butterflies described in 1850
Junoniini
Butterflies of Africa